Eva Lohse (née Müller-Tamm; born 23 January 1956 in Ludwigshafen) is a German politician of the Christian Democratic Union (CDU). She was the mayor (Oberbürgermeisterin) of Ludwigshafen from 2002 to 2017.

In addition to her work as Mayor, Lohse served as president of the Deutscher Städtetag from June 2015 to December 2017. The group is the head organization and lobby group for 3400 German cities vis-à-vis the Cabinet of Germany, the German Bundestag, the Bundesrat of Germany, the European Union (EU) and many organizations.

Early life and career
Lohse was born in Ludwigshafen in 1956. She studied law at the universities of Heidelberg, Geneva and Freiburg. After the first state exam she studied administrative law at the Verwaltungshochschule Speyer. In 1995 she graduated as a Doctor of Law. From 1987 to 1996 she hold different positions in the regional administration, in the Ministry of the Interior of the State of Rhineland-Palatinate and the police department Rheinpfalz in Ludwigshafen. From 1996 to 2001, Lohse was a lecturer at the Fachhochschule of Public Administration, Department of Labor Administration, in Mannheim with the subjects of administrative, employment and social law.

Political career
Lohse joined the Christian Democratic Union and was elected to the local city council of her birthplace Ludwigshafen in 1994.

In May 2001, Lohse was elected mayor of Ludwigshafen, in the first round with 55.51% of the votes. She became the city's first directly elected woman Oberbürgermeister and the first Christian Democrat in this position since 1945. In 2004, she was in discussion to become the top candidate for the CDU in the state elections in Rhineland-Palatinate. However, she refused to run against the chairman of the party, Christoph Böhr. On 7 June 2009 she was re-elected in the first round with 53.7% of the votes.

In 2015, Federal Minister for Economic Affairs and Energy Sigmar Gabriel appointed Lohse to the government's advisory board on the Transatlantic Trade and Investment Partnership (TTIP).

In November 2016, Lohse announced that she would not run for the next mayor's election. Her term of office ended in December 2017.

Other activities
 2005–2017 Präsidium des Deutschen Städtetages, member
 2006–2017 Verband Region Rhein-Neckar, president
 2006–2017 Verein Zukunft Metropolregion Rhein Neckar e.V., vice-president
 2012–2017 Deutscher Sparkassen- und Giroverband, vice-president
 2013–2015 Deutscher Städtetag, vice-president

Personal life
Lohse is married and has two daughters.

References

External links

 Porträt der Oberbürgermeisterin Dr. Eva Lohse 

1956 births
Christian Democratic Union of Germany politicians
Living people
Mayors of places in Rhineland-Palatinate
Women mayors of places in Germany
21st-century German women politicians
20th-century German women politicians